The Liverpool Cricket Club Lawn Tennis Tournament. was an early Victorian era men's  grass court tennis tournament first staged in June 1881 at the Liverpool Cricket Club, Aigburth Cricket Ground, Liverpool, Lancashire, England. The inaugural men's  singles event was won by Richard Taswell Richardson a two time Wimbledon finalist. It was staged only three times until 1883.

History
The Liverpool Cricket Club Lawn Tennis Tournament was an early open men's and women's grass court tennis tournament first stage in 1881 at the Liverpool Cricket Club, Aigburth Cricket Ground, Liverpool, Lancashire, England. This was same venue where the prestigious Northern Championships were also held in alternating years between the Northern Lawn Tennis Club in Manchester and the Aigburth ground.

A description of the event that concluded on 18 June 1881:

Finals
Incomplete Rolls

Gentleman's singles

Gentleman's pairs

Ladies pairs

References

Sources
 Routledges Sporting Annual (1882) Lawn Tennis in 1881. George Routledge and Son. London.    
 The Field. Saturday 18 June 1881. London. England.    
 The Field. Saturday 14 July 1883. London. England.

Defunct tennis tournaments in the United Kingdom
Grass court tennis tournaments